Adam Cheng Siu-chow  (born 24 February 1947) is a Hong Kong TVB actor and Cantopop singer.

Career 

Cheng started his career in the 1970s, where he gained a reputation for playing the lead roles in TVB Wuxia drama series based on the works of Louis Cha and Gu Long, such as The Heaven Sword and Dragon Saber and Chor Lau Heung. He also performed some of the theme songs of the TV series he starred in, such as The Greed of Man and Cold Blood Warm Heart.

Ting Hai effect 

In 1992, TVB released the TV series The Greed of Man, based on the central theme of the stock market and explored the schemes and plots used by people to make their fortune in the market. Cheng played Ting Hai (丁蟹) in the series, who made an immense fortune by short selling derivatives and stocks during a bear market. Many people went bankrupt while Ting Hai's family became richer until they were defeated by their nemesis. Cheng became popularly associated with the Ting Hai effect, named after his character in the series. The effect involves a peculiar and unexplained phenomenon, in which global stock markets will fall whenever a new Hong Kong TV drama series, starring Cheng, is aired.

Personal life 
Adam's parents are both university lecturers. He has four daughters. The oldest, Cheng On-yee, was from his first low-profile marriage that ended in divorce. He married well-known actress Lydia Shum in 1985 after 14 years of cohabitation, and Shum brought him to fame. Adam and Shum had a daughter, Joyce Cheng in 1987. In 1988 they divorced eight months after their daughter's birth in bad terms.

In 1989, Cheng married a Taiwanese actress named Koon Jing-wah. Cheng and Koon have two daughters, Winnie Cheng Wing-yan and Cecily Cheng Wing-hei.

Adam graduated from the Hong Kong Academy for Performing Arts.

Filmography

Film

Television

References

External links 

 Adam Cheng Siu-Chow at hkmdb.com
 Adam Cheng at senscritique.com
 

  	 

1947 births
Living people
Cantopop singers
Hong Kong male film actors
Hong Kong Mandopop singers
Hong Kong male singers
Hong Kong male television actors
Hong Kong television presenters
TVB veteran actors
20th-century Hong Kong male actors
21st-century Hong Kong male actors
Hong Kong Buddhists
Adoptees
Hong Kong idols